El Rio Villa is an unincorporated community in Yolo County, California.

References

Unincorporated communities in California
Unincorporated communities in Yolo County, California